Alan Leitner is an American abstract artist.  He was born in 1947 in an ethnically diverse section of Los Angeles.  Alan was the middle of three children in a Jewish family.  He received his B.S. in art in 1971 from Woodbury University in Los Angeles, where he met his first wife who wanted to move to Hawaii.  Also in 1971, he acquired an art foundry that produced blown glass, sculpture, ceramics and paintings, which contributed greatly to his understanding of art.  In 1987, he received a M.F.A. in painting from the University of Hawaii at Manoa.  The graduate program required students to do some teaching, and through this teaching he met Alyn Brownley who at the time headed the art program at Leeward Community College.  Brownley requested Alan to teach her art class for one semester while she pursued a move to University of Hawaii at Manoa.  After graduation, Dr. John Conner, the department associate dean, offered Alan a full-time teaching position at Leeward Community College, where he is currently a professor.  Alan has also taught at Honolulu Community College and University of Hawaii at Manoa.

Leitner's art is abstract, utilizing muted earth tones as the main colors.  He often affixes various objects to his canvases.  Untitled #4, in the collection of the Honolulu Museum of Art, is typical of his later work.

Footnotes

References
 Clarke, Joan and Diane Dods, Artists/Hawaii, Honolulu, University of Hawaii Press, 1996, 32–37.
 Hartwell, Patricia L. (editor), Retrospective 1967-1987, Hawaii State Foundation on Culture and the Arts, Honolulu, Hawaii, 1987, p. 71
 International Art Society of Hawai'i, Kuilima Kākou, Hawai’i-Japan Joint Exhibition, Honolulu, International Art Society of Hawai'i, 2004, p. 27
 Morse, Marcia and Allison Wong, 10 Years: The Contemporary Museum at First Hawaiian Center, The Contemporary Museum, Honolulu, 2006, p. 73
 Wong, Allison, 10 Years - The Contemporary Museum at First Hawaiian Center - Tenth Anniversary Exhibition, The Contemporary Museum, Honolulu, Hawaii, 2006, p. 73
 Yoshihara, Lisa A., Collective Visions, 1967-1997, [Hawaii] State Foundation on Culture and the Arts, Honolulu, Hawaii, 1997, 118.

American abstract artists
Painters from Hawaii
Abstract painters
1947 births
Living people
Jewish American artists
Woodbury University alumni
20th-century American painters
21st-century American painters
21st-century American male artists
21st-century American Jews
20th-century American male artists
University of Hawaiʻi at Mānoa alumni
University of Hawaiʻi at Mānoa faculty